Forestland is an electronic dance music festival that takes place in Međimurje County, Croatia. It is one of Croatia's most popular electronic music events.

See also

List of electronic music festivals
Live electronic music

References

External links
forestland.hr

2013 establishments in Croatia
Electronic music festivals in Croatia
Music festivals established in 2013
Tourist attractions in Međimurje County